Yuraq Q'asa (Quechua yuraq white, q'asa mountain pass, "white mountain pass", Hispanicized spelling Yuraccasa) is a mountain in the Andes of Peru, about  high. It is located in the Cusco Region, Espinar Province,  Condoroma District.

References

Mountains of Peru
Mountains of Cusco Region